3BallMTY (pronounced "Tribal Monterrey") is a Mexican pop DJ group from the city of Monterrey, Nuevo León, Mexico. The "DJ Collective" (the name its members have formally given themselves) was formed in 2009 by two teenage DJs – Sergio Zavala (DJ Sheeqo Beat), and Alberto Presenda (DJ Otto). The name "3Ball" comes from the Spanish word "tribal", which refers to the culture of Guaracha tribal music popular in many Spanish-speaking countries around the world.

History

2009: Formation of 3Ball MTY
In August 2009, teenage Monterrey disc jockey Erick Rincon joined up with fellow DJs Sergio Zavala and Alberto Presenda. Quite fitting to their synthy, techno-inspired sound, the three DJs met through the Internet. The trio had a vision of combining two fundamental facets of the music industry – production and performance. Rincon has cited Between 2009 and 2010, the group became known as 3BallMTY, and set out to lay a new foundation for "latino electronica", which 3Ball has introduced that year.

In December 2010, they were invited to the Worldtronics festival being held in Germany. It was the first time the group traveled outside Mexico. In 2011, the group signed a record contract with label Latin Power Music, a division of Universal Music. On December 6, they released their debut album, Intentalo, which features collaborations with artists such as Smoky, America Sierra, El Bebeto, Morenito, Favela, Milkman and Horacio Palencia.

2010 - 2013: Intentalo, Latin Music Awards,Touring 
3Ball MTY rose to prominence in 2012 when their single "Inténtalo", taken from their first studio album of the same name, featuring El Bebeto and America Sierra reached No.1 on the Billboard Latin Songs chart for two non-consecutive weeks. The song was performed live by the group at the 2012 ceremony of the Billboard Latin Music Awards.

On February 4, 2012, they began their  first tour of Mexico.

On October 18, 2012, 3Ball MTY and Gerardo Ortiz dominated the Billboard Mexican Music Awards. At the second annual music awards 3Ball MTY received 9 awards with some of those including New Artist of the Year, Artist of the Year, Duo or Group; Song Artist of the Year and Digital Download Artist of the Year.

On November 15, 2012, 3Ball MTY won the Latin Grammy Award for Best New Artist.

In 2013, they released a new single "Quiero Bailar (All Through the Night)" featuring Becky G. It premiered on September 10, 2013 on Univision. It is featured on the PlayStation 4 and Xbox One versions of Need for Speed Rivals.

2014 - 2015: Globall, and Touring 
On March 24, 2014, 3Ball MTY released their second studio album "Globall" with various artist on the albums; such as Belinda, Far East Movement, Becky G, Gerardo Ortiz, Cowboy Troy, Las Cumbia Girls, and Jotdog.

2016 - 2017: Erick Rincon's departure, "Bailar Contigo" - Single 
On July 5, 2016, it has been announced by both members that Erick Rincon decided to leave the group to venture off on individual projects. It was also revealed that he was struggling in keeping up with both individual projects and group projects. The same year the group released the single "Bailar Contigo" featuring Chyno Miranda and El Jova, and performed at various concerts.

2018 - 2019: Various singles and collaborations, and Touring 
On November 2, 2018 3Ball MTY released there single "Tequila" featuring Chayin Rubio.

On March 14–15, 2019 3Ball MTY attended the SXSW 2019 at Austin, Texas, alongside Voz de Mando, Vanessa Zamora, and Agrupacion Carino.

2020 - present: "Ferrari" - Single, SOMOS, Other Projects 
During the month of January "Intentalo" was on Billboards top 100 placing at 38. On January 29, 2020 3Ball MTY released a new single "Ferrari" featuring Morenito de Fuego. The following month 3BALL MTY released there third studio album SOMOS with promotions after the release date. Following the release of the album, and promotions. 3BALL MTY released a statement on July 22 through social media "Nueva Musica en Camino"

Members 
Current Members:

 Alberto Presenda (DJ Otto) — Born on November 5, 1992, Cunduacán, Mexico (Age )
 Sergio Zavala (DJ Sheeqo) — Born on March 7, 1992, Monterrey, Mexico (Age )

Former Members:

 Erick Rincon — Born on August 17, 1993, Monterrey, Mexico (Age )

Discography

Albums

Singles

Remixes
 2012: Steve Aoki & Angger Dimas & Dimitri Vegas & Like Mike - Phat Brahms (3Ball MTY Remix)

Videoagraphy

Awards and nominations

Premios Juventud (2012)

Premios Billboard de la Música Regional Mexicana (2012)

Notes

References

Musical groups established in 2009
Mexican musical groups
Musical groups from Monterrey
Latin Grammy Award winners
Universal Music Latin Entertainment artists
Techno music groups
Latin Grammy Award for Best New Artist
Mexican electronic musical groups
2009 establishments in Mexico